Aleksandar Petrović (14 January 1929 – 20 August 1994) was a Serbian film director. He was one of the major figures of the Yugoslav Black Wave. Two of his films were nominated for the Academy Award for Best Foreign Language Film: Three in 1966 and I Even Met Happy Gypsies (Feather Gatherers) in 1967. The latter (original title "Skupljaci perja") was the first movie that presented the existence of Gypsies in society and everyday life; it was also the first full-feature film where Gypsies spoke their own language, Roma. Most roles were interpreted by real Gypsies; this was their movie. "As a child, I observed them and saw in these people faith and irrationality," said Petrović I Even Met Happy Gypsies won the FIPRESCI Prize and the Grand Prize of the Jury at the Cannes Film Festival; it also received a nomination for a Golden Globe. In 1967 Petrović was a member of the jury at the 17th Berlin International Film Festival.

One of his most famous films is It Rains in My Village. Petrović found inspiration for this film in Fyodor Dostoyevsky's novel The Possessed. The film was nominated for a Palme d'Or (Golden Palm) at the 1969 Cannes Film Festival

In 1973, Petrović was forced to leave his post at the Belgrade Film Academy after being accused of holding anti-communist views by the communist government of Yugoslavia. In late December 1989, he joined the founding committee of the Democratic Party in Serbia, the first opposition anti-communist party in Serbia. He died at age 65 in Paris, France.

Petrović published several hundreds of articles and several books, including Novi film I: 1960-1965 and Novi film II: Crni film (1965-1970).

Filmography

References

External links
 Official Website aleksandarpetrovic.org

Profile of Aleksandar Petrović and one of his leading films in English
Short biographical profile from the New York Times
Profile of Aleksandar-Saša Petrović and his most well known film “I Even Met Happy Gypsies”

1929 births
1994 deaths
Serbian film directors
French-language film directors
German-language film directors
Golden Arena for Best Director winners
University of Belgrade alumni
Yugoslav film directors